Graham Fulton is a Scottish poet.

Life and career
Graham Fulton (born 8 January 1959) has been writing and performing poetry since 1987 when he first attended a writers' group run by poet Tom Leonard  in Paisley, which also included Jeff Torrington, Brian Whittingham and Suhayl Saadi, and was a founder member of the influential Itinerant Poets performance and publishing group, which featured Jim Ferguson, Ronald McNeil and Bobby Christie. They produced
the Tower of Babble pamphlet in 1987.

His first major collection of poems Humouring the Iron Bar Man, was published by Polygon in 1990. Further collections include This (Rebel Inc, 1993), Knights of the Lower Floors (Polygon, 1994) and Ritual Soup and other liquids (Mariscat Press, 2002). He was joint winner of the prestigious Scotia Bar First of May Poetry Prize in the 1990s, and was an editorial board member of the West Coast Magazine  which featured up and coming writers of the time including Irvine Welsh (short fiction). His work has appeared in numerous literary publications in both the UK and US, and has been broadcast on BBC Radio Scotland and Scottish Television. He has been the recipient of three Scottish Arts Council bursaries.

Later publications include a sequence about the Glasgow underground called Inner Circle (2008), Found Objects: a CD of photographs (2008), Suspect Novelties: order, chaos, the whole etc. (2009), Pocket Fugues (2009) and twenty three umbrellas (2009) which have all been produced by his own imprint Controlled Explosion Press which he established in 2008. These limited editions are often handmade and experimental in nature and combine poetry, photography and illustration.

Publications in 2010 were Unsaved Messages and twenty three buildings (both from Controlled Explosion Press) and Black Motel/The Man who Forgot How to which was launched by award-winning Roncadora Press in October 2010 and features monotype illustrations by artist Hugh Bryden. A full-length collection called Open Plan about working in an office was published in February 2011 by Smokestack Books. He also found a publisher for his father's World War 2 diaries, A Waggoner's War by Fergus Fulton, which was produced by Woodfield Publishing in May 2011. The Ruin of Poltalloch, a  chapbook about the Mid Argyll seat of the Malcolm family combining poetry and photographs, was published in June 2011.
The Zombie Poem, about attending the casting for zombie movie epic World War Z which was partly filmed
in Glasgow, was published in October 2011. A major full-length collection Full Scottish Breakfast was published in November 2011 by Red Squirrel Press and Upside Down Heart (featuring illustrations by artist Becky Bolton) was published in February 2012. A new pamphlet collection Speed of Dark was published in September 2012, and The Universe is a Silly Place was published in 2013.

Reclaimed Land : A Sixties Childhood, a storypoem history, was published by The Grimsay Press in 2013. Photographing Ghosts with illustrations by Hugh Bryden was published in 2014 by Roncadora Press, One Day in the Life of Jimmy Denisovich was published by Smokestack Books in 2014, and Continue was published by Penniless Press in 2015. A selected poems collection called Edible Transmitters has been translated into Romanian, Italian and Spanish. He was also a contributor to an anthology of translated Palestinian poetry A Bird is not a Stone which was published by Freight Books in 2014.

He is also co-author of Pub Dogs of Glasgow, Pub Dogs of London and Pub Dogs of Manchester published by Freight Books in 2014 and 2015.

Brian Wilson in Swansea Bus Station was published by Red Squirrel Press in 2015. Paragraphs at the End of the World was published by Penniless Press in 2016. Equal Night was published by Irish publisher Salmon Poetry in 2017. Another new work Something Good Will Always Happen was published by Penniless Press in 2018. Circulation was published by new Paisley-based publisher Clochoderick Press in 2018. 

A long poem containing illustrations called Flesh and Stone, about the Kilmartin Glen and Loch Craignish area of Argyll, was published by Controlled Explosion Press in 2018. A history The Paisley Civil War about the town of Paisley's connections to the American Civil War was published by Controlled Explosion Press in 2018.

Other new books since 2018 are Glitches of Mortality from Pindrop Press in 2018 and Consumption: Selected Pamphlets 2008-2019 from Penniless Press in 2020. Coronaworld, the first major collection of poems about the Coronavirus pandemic by a British poet, was published in August 2020 by Penniless Press. Chips, Paracetamol and Wine was published by Smokestack Books at the end of 2020. In 2021 Replacement Service: Collected Bus Poems was published by Seahorse Publications, and The Stanley Kubrick Shop, a pamphlet collection about an exhibition in London in 2019, was produced by Controlled Explosion Press.

In 2003 Edwin Morgan was asked to make a list of what he considered to be the best  poems written by Scottish poets between the years 1978-2002. This was for an SPL anthology edited by poet Ken Cockburn and Robyn Marsack, the Director of the Scottish Poetry Library. Graham Fulton's Cream of Scottish Youth was included on the list. Fulton's poem was then removed from the list for some reason, presumably because they wanted a neater 'top ten', and presumably because he was the least well-known of the poets. The complete original list, and Edwin's letter to Ken Cockburn, can be seen in the book Edwin Morgan: The Midnight Letterbox which was published by Carcanet in 2015. Fulton has always been an individualist, working outside the self-appointed back-slapping elite of the Scottish poetry establishment.

He's read his poems live from Los Angeles in the US to Barlinnie Prison in Glasgow to the Morden Tower in Newcastle.

Personal life and early career

Graham Fulton was born in Hampton, England. He moved to Paisley with
his mother and father, Jessie and Fergus, and older brother Gordon
in 1963. He attended Ralston Primary School and Camphill High School, which later became Gleniffer High School,
in Paisley. After school he studied Art and Design at Cardonald College
in Glasgow. He was also one of the writers with punk Fanzine Stagnant Pool of Disease
whose main editor Tommy Cherry went on to form cult Scottish rock band The Bachelor
Pad. Graham Fulton got a job as a Technician with Renfrew District Council in 1981.
A job which lasted 30 years. He used to run marathons. He used to play the drums. He is the great-grandson of Alexander McLardie who played professional football with Abercorn, St. Mirren and Burnley, and was capped once for the Scottish League in 1893. He married the painter Helen Nathaniel, originally from Swansea, in 2006. In 2014 they co-produced a pamphlet of poems and stories called The Dts commemorating the birth of the Welsh poet Dylan Thomas. They live in Paisley.

Bibliography 

 Tower of Babble  (with Jim Ferguson, Ronald McNeil and Bobby Christie)  (Itinerant), 1987 
 The Eighth Dwarf   (Itinerant), 1989 
 Humouring the Iron Bar Man   Polygon, 1990 
 This   (Rebel Inc), 1993
 Knights of the Lower Floors   (Polygon), 1994 
 Blissed-out for 5: New Writing   (with David Crystal, Des Dillon, Ally May and Shug Hanlan) (Neruda Press), 1997 
 Ritual Soup and Other Liquids   (Mariscat Press), 2002 
 Inner Circle   (Controlled Explosion Press), 2008 
 Found Objects: a CD of photographs   (Controlled Explosion Press), 2008 
 Suspect Novelties: order, chaos, the whole etc.   (Controlled Explosion Press), 2009 
 Pocket Fugues   (Controlled Explosion Press), 2009 
 twenty three umbrellas   (Controlled Explosion Press), 2009 
 Unsaved Messages   (Controlled Explosion Press), 2010 
 twenty three buildings  (Controlled Explosion Press), 2010 
 (scrollpoem) The Story of Mulder and Scully Without Having to Watch the Entire Nine Seasons  (Controlled Explosion Press), 2010
 Open Plan  (Smokestack Books), 2011 
 five coffee stains done on yellow stickies at work  (Controlled Explosion Press), 2011
 The Ruin of Poltalloch  (Controlled Explosion Press), 2011 
 Waiting for the Clouds ( a poem for zombies)  (Controlled Explosion Press), 2011
 The Zombie Poem  (Controlled Explosion Press), 2011 
 TV89: Graham Fulton on STV's Inverse (DVD) (Controlled Explosion Press), 2011
 Full Scottish Breakfast  (Red Squirrel Press), 2011 
 Upside Down Heart  (Controlled Explosion Press), 2012 
 Speed of Dark  (Controlled Explosion Press), 2012 
 The Military Graves of Cockett Cemetery  (The Lippiatt Press), 2013
 Reclaimed Land  (The Grimsay Press), 2013 
 The Universe is a Silly Place  (Controlled Explosion Press), 2013 
 Return to the Ruin of Poltalloch  (Controlled Explosion Press), 2014 
 One Day in the Life of Jimmy Denisovich (Smokestack Books), 2014 
 11 Poems About the First World War (Controlled Explosion Press), 2014 
 Photographing Ghosts (Roncadora Press), 2014 
 Pub Dogs of Glasgow  (with Reuben Paris)  (Freight Books), 2014 
 The DTs  (with Helen Nathaniel-Fulton)  (Controlled Explosion Press), 2014 
 Newscotland Man  (Tin Pants Press), 2015 
 Continue  (Penniless Press Publications), 2015 
 Edible Transmitters  (Bibliotheca Universalis(Romania)), 2015 
 Pub Dogs of London (with Fiona Freund)  (Freight Books), 2015 
 Pub Dogs of Manchester  (with Georgie Glass)  (Freight Books), 2015 
 Brian Wilson in Swansea Bus Station  (Red Squirrel Press), 2015 
 Paragraphs at the End of the World  (Penniless Press Publications), 2016 
 twenty three telephones  (Controlled Explosion Press), 2016 
 Equal Night   (Salmon Poetry), 2017 
 Circulation   (Clochoderick Press), 2018 
 Something Good Will Always Happen   (Penniless Press Publications), 2018 
 Flesh and Stone  (Controlled Explosion Press), 2018 
 The Paisley Civil War  (Controlled Explosion Press), 2018 
 Glitches of Mortality  (Pindrop Press), 2018 
 The Ingress Pictures  (Urban Free Press), 2019 
 Consumption: Selected Pamphlets 2008-2019  (Penniless Press Publications), 2020 
 Coronaworld  (Penniless Press Publications), 2020 
 Chips, Paracetamol and Wine (Smokestack Books), 2020 
 Replacement Service: Collected Bus Poems (Seahorse Publications), 2021 
 The Stanley Kubrick Shop (Controlled Explosion Press), 2021 
 I Saw Tommy (Published in Silence Press), 2022 
 The Jackdaw Files (Seahorse Publications), 2022 
 Dreams of Scottish Youth Volume 1 (Published in Silence Press), 2022 
 Dreams of Scottish Youth Volume 2 (Published in Silence Press), 2022

References

http://www.paisley.org.uk/famous-people/graham-fulton/

External links
Graham Fulton, Poem: Humouring the Iron Bar Man
Graham Fulton website  www.grahamfulton-poetry.com

1959 births
Living people
Poets from Paisley, Renfrewshire